James McDonald (September 12, 1843 - January 15, 1915) was a British-born American oil industrialist.

Early life
James McDonald was born in Wellhead, Morayshire, in North Scotland on September 23, 1840.  He was the son of Alexander McDonald and Janet McKenzie McDonald. He was twice married, his second wife being Isabella J. McDonald, whom he married in Brighton, England, on July 27, 1903. He had one child, James McDonald Jr. who was born in Cincinnati, Ohio, on May 8, 1890

McDonald, who, with his older brother, Alexander McDonald, was one of the builders of the petroleum industry in the United States and Europe, came to the United States in early childhood and was reared on this side of the Atlantic and spent the greater part of his life in America. He received his education in the Academy and High Schools of Chillicothe, Ohio, and later attended a Military Academy in Talbot County, Maryland.

McDonald enlisted in the Union Army at the outbreak of the Civil War and served in the Quartermaster's Department as Civilian Clerk, going through the Georgia campaign with Sherman's Army and also through other campaigns.

Career

At the close of the American Civil War, Mr. McDonald and his brother settled in Cincinnati and became involved in the petroleum business. They were amongst the largest independent operators in the country when the Standard Oil Company was formed and when that great corporation was organized they formed a business connection with it, although they did not sell outright.  Their own company was known as the Consolidated Tank Line Company and remained under their control, with steadily increasing business, until 1890, when they decided to exchange their stock for stock of the Standard Oil of New Jersey of New Jersey, thus becoming part of the larger corporation.

Thereafter, Alexander McDonald became President of the Standard Oil Company of Kentucky and James McDonald went to England to aid in the organization and development of the Anglo-American Oil Company (later becoming Esso UK), another subsidiary of the Standard Oil Company, through which its export business was conducted.

McDonald was made Chairman of the Anglo American Oil Company and also became a director in various other companies throughout Europe.  He was the representative of the parent organization in all of its dealings with the foreign companies and to him is due, in large measure, the remarkable organization which the Standard Oil company has built up.

McDonald, although born under the British flag, was a loyal son to his adopted country and took a patriotic interest in the expansion of the American commercial strength.  He worked incessantly in organizing the petroleum export trade of the United States and to him is due, more than any other individual, the opening up of the world's markets to the American product

As the European representative of the Standard Oil Company, McDonald had one of the most important offices in the entire organization.  He had to possess not only the highest ability as a business executive but also was required to exhibit unusual powers as a diplomatist.  When he first went abroad the greater portion of the petroleum used on the Continent and in the British Isles came from the wells of Russia, and the work of placing the American product was one of the most stupendous tasks ever attempted by one man.

Russia, for so long the petroleum dictator of Europe, resisted his efforts strenuously and in many ways, and frequently was joined by other oil-producing countries of the Old World, but McDonald met this formidable competition unflinchingly and in the end had the satisfaction of seeing America's product on a par with its rivals in the markets of Europe

In addition to the work of opening the European markets, McDonald was charged with the details of supplying the petroleum and was in command of the immense fleets of oil tank steamers operated by the Anglo-American Oil Company and other organizations, between America and Europe and between European ports. Mr. McDonald not only directed the operation of the fleets but also had an active part in the designing and building of the vessels, which transport millions of gallons of oil across the seas annually.

During the many years of this strenuous campaign, McDonald devoted himself unselfishly to his task, working many hours of the day, and oftentimes going without sleep. This was a terrific strain on his powers, and although he was possessed of remarkable physical endurance, he virtually wore himself out through overwork. His efforts were rewarded with gratifying success and a tremendous commercial conquest, but he paid the penalty of sacrificing his health.

In 1906, after having worked uninterruptedly for more than forty-six years, McDonald developed a serious affliction of the heart and was compelled to retire from all active business. After that time he has travelled to all parts of the world in search of health, under orders of his physicians to avoid exertion, physical or mental, as much as possible. Finding it necessary to live in a warm climate, he went to Southern California in the winter of 1911-12 and spent the season there, planning the return there each winter in the future.  McDonald died on January 13, 1915, in Washington, D.C. and was buried in the family mausoleum in Brompton Cemetery.

From the time he went to England to reside McDonald has made his home there in London, with only occasional visits to the United States. He built a magnificent residence in Cadogan Square and took a prominent part in the social life of the metropolis.

McDonald was one of the leading clubmen of London, being a member of the Empire, Bathe, Ranelagh and Royal Automobile Clubs of the Capital; also of Phyllis Court, at Henley-on-Thames. He was also a faithful member of St. Columba's Church, London.

Notes

References

1843 births
1915 deaths
American businesspeople in the oil industry
Burials at Brompton Cemetery
Founders of the petroleum industry
Standard Oil
British emigrants to the United States